Anthony "Tony" Lecce (born January 1, 1945) is an Italian-born Canadian former soccer defender who earned nine caps with the Canadian national soccer team and played four seasons in the North American Soccer League.

Career 
Lecce played in 1964 with Toronto Italia in the Eastern Canada Professional Soccer League for three seasons. Throughout his tenure with Italia he received the league's MVP award in 1965. In 1967, he played in the American Soccer League with Boston Tigers. He played in the North American Soccer League (NASL) in 1968 with Toronto Falcons. In early 1969, he played with Rochester Lancers in the American Soccer League. The remainder of the season he played in the National Soccer League with former club Toronto Italia. The following season he played with league rivals Toronto Hungaria. In 1971, he returned to the NASL to sign with Toronto Metros from 1971 through 1973.

International career 
He played for Canada where he made his debut on October 6, 1968 against Bermuda in a FIFA World Cup qualifying match. He would make eight appearances for the national team.

References

External links
 
 
 NASL stats

1945 births
Living people
Footballers from Rome
Canada men's international soccer players
Canadian soccer players
Canadian expatriate soccer players
Expatriate soccer players in the United States
Canadian expatriate sportspeople in the United States
Italian emigrants to Canada
Association football defenders
Eastern Canada Professional Soccer League players
American Soccer League (1933–1983) players
Canadian National Soccer League players
North American Soccer League (1968–1984) players
Toronto Italia players
Boston Tigers players
Toronto Falcons (1967–68) players
Rochester Lancers (1967–1980) players
Toronto Blizzard (1971–1984) players